Rikke Broen Magersholt (born 13 October 1972) is a retired Danish badminton player.

Career Summary 
Danish Junior champion, WD, together with Marianne Rasmussen, U15, 1985–86
Danish Junior champion, WD, together with Camilla Martin / Højbjerg, U17, 1988-1989
Nordic Junior champion, MD, together with Peter Christensen / Højbjerg, U19, 1990
Nordic Junior champion, WD, together with Camilla Martin / Højbjerg, U19, 1990
Nordic Junior champion, XD, together with Peter Christensen / Højbjerg, U19, 1991)
European Junior champion, XD, together with Peter Christensen / Højbjerg, U19, 1991

In her senior international career, Broen won the Norwegian International in 1991, the Amor International (held in Netherlands) in 1996, Slovak International in 1996 and 1997, the Strasbourg International (held in France) in 1997 and the Hungarian International in 1998.

Achievements

European Junior Championships
Mixed doubles

IBF International 
Women's doubles

Mixed doubles

References 

1972 births
Living people
Danish female badminton players
20th-century Danish women